Salerm is a commune in the Haute-Garonne department in southwestern France.

A small village but a very friendly community. It is home to gite31, a luxury gite, that attracts international tourist from as far as Hong Kong. There are many tourist attractions within 30 minutes and less than an hour from Toulouse. 

It has its own tennis court and an annual fete in mid summer.

Population

See also
Communes of the Haute-Garonne department

References

Communes of Haute-Garonne